Starobalakovo (İśke Balaq) is a rural locality (a selo) in Chekmagushevsky District, Bashkortostan, Russia. The population was 218 as of 2010. There are 3 streets.

Geography 
Starobalakovo is located 25 km northwest of Chekmagush (the district's administrative centre) by road. Taynyashevo is the nearest rural locality.

References 

Rural localities in Chekmagushevsky District